Josh Kennedy may refer to:

 Joshua Kennedy (born 1982), Australian soccer player
 Josh Kennedy (footballer, born 1987), Australian rules footballer with the West Coast Eagles and previously Carlton Football Club
 Josh Kennedy (footballer, born 1988), Australian rules footballer with the Sydney Swans and previously Hawthorn